This is a 'list of Advanced Level (usually referred to as A-Level) subjects.

 

 Withdrawn subjects 
 Anthropology
 Archaeology
 Citizenship Studies
 Classics
 Communication and Culture
 Creative Writing
 Critical Thinking
 Dutch
 Economics and Business
 Engineering
 General Studies
 Global Development (AS) 
 Home Economics
 Human Biology
 Humanities
 Information and communication technology
 Leisure studies
 Performance studies
 Performing arts
 Pure Mathematics
 Quantitative Methods (AS) Science in Society
 Use of Mathematics (AS)''
 World Development

See also 
 List of CIE Advanced Level subjects

References 

Educational qualifications in the United Kingdom
School qualifications
School examinations
United Kingdom education-related lists